Savinsko is a small settlement in the Municipality of Makole in northeastern Slovenia. It lies in the hills above the left bank of the Dravinja River. The area is part of the traditional region of Styria. It is now included with the rest of the municipality in the Drava Statistical Region.

References

External links
Savinsko at Geopedia

Populated places in the Municipality of Makole